Robert Francis Hastings (April 18, 1925 – June 30, 2014) was an American actor. He was best known for his portrayal of Lt. Elroy Carpenter on McHale's Navy and voicing Commissioner James Gordon in the DC Animated Universe.

Early life
Hastings was born in Brooklyn, New York, a son of Charles and Hazel Hastings. His father was a salesman. He started out as a boy singer on National Barn Dance,  Doug Gray's Singing Gang and Coast to Coast on a Bus. He also portrayed Jerry on the radio program The Sea Hound. Hastings served during World War II as a navigator on B-29s in the United States Army Air Corps.

Career

After Hastings returned from military service, he played the role of Archie Andrews in a series based on the Archie comic book series on NBC Radio from 1945 to 1953. Hastings also voiced many characters on the radio show X Minus One, sometimes providing the voice for multiple characters in a single episode. 

Hastings moved to television in 1949, performing in early science-fiction series, including Atom Squad. In 1954, he was the featured pitch-man (acting as an amateur magician) for Bakers Instant Cocoa Mix television commercials. His first recurring role was as a lieutenant on Phil Silvers' Sergeant Bilko series in the late 1950s. At that time he also guest-starred on Walter Brennan's ABC sitcom The Real McCoys, in an episode titled “How to Paint a House”. He also appeared in Captain Video playing the brother of "The Video Ranger", who was, in turn, played by Hastings' real-life brother, Don. Hastings portrayed Edward Foyle in the NBC drama Kitty Foyle (1958).

1960s–1970s
Most of his career was spent in television, including two episodes of CBS's Green Acres as an Air Force officer and as a sheriff. Hastings was cast as Lt. Bolt in the 1960 episode "Space Man" of the CBS military sitcom/drama Hennesey, starring Jackie Cooper. Hastings guest-starred in the ABC/Warner Bros. sitcom Room for One More, starring Andrew Duggan and Peggy McCay, on the Robert Young CBS sitcom/drama Window on Main Street, as Russian pilot Igor Piotkin on Hogan's Heroes, and on the NBC police sitcom Car 54, Where Are You?. In 1962, he played a railroad executive in the episode "Substitute Sheriff" of the NBC Western series The Tall Man. He appeared five times on CBS's Dennis the Menace, most notably as Coach Gilmore in the 1963 episode "The Big Basketball Game". He appeared three times (1961-62) on the sitcom Pete and Gladys.
 
Hastings portrayed the aide to Captain Binghamton (Joe Flynn), the yes-man Lieutenant Elroy Carpenter on ABC's McHale's Navy, humorously called "Carpy" and "Little Leadbottom" by McHale and his men. Hastings played Captain Ramsey on ABC's General Hospital. He was also the voice of the Raven on episodes of CBS's The Munsters. He hosted the game show Dealer's Choice and had a recurring role as bar owner Tommy Kelsey on All in the Family.

After McHale's Navy, Hastings was a regular on the Universal Studios lot, where Universal paid actors during downtime to be on the grounds and talk to tourists. He appeared in the 1968 Universal film Did You Hear the One About the Traveling Saleslady?, as well as The Bamboo Saucer (1968), Angel in My Pocket (1969), The Love God? (1969), and The Boatniks (1970). In 1971, Hastings was cast in the comedy film How to Frame a Figg, also starring Don Knotts, and also had roles in The Poseidon Adventure (1972), The All-American Boy (1973) and No Deposit, No Return (1976). Hastings also appeared in Harper Valley PTA (1978) as Skeeter Duggan a member of the PTA board who had been kidnapped at the orders of its dishonest president to commit election fraud. Hastings also played Cousin Phantom of the Opera in the 1981 television film The Munsters' Revenge.

Voice-over work
Hastings also did voice work for animation and commercials, including Superboy in The New Adventures of Superboy cartoons of the 1960s, D.D. on Hanna-Barbera's Clue Club, and James Gordon in the DC Animated Universe, as well as several Batman video games. His earlier work in animation included voicing Henry Glopp on Hanna-Barbera's animated series Jeannie and Fred Flintstone and Friends as well as voicing characters on Challenge of the Super Friends.

Hastings toured the country as a participant in various Old-Time Radio conventions, reading scripts for such shows as Archie Andrews and The Bickersons. He appeared at the 2013 Cincinnati Nostalgia Expo, the Radio Enthusiasts of Puget Sound Showcase 2013 in Bellevue, Washington, in June 2010, and at the Friends of Old Time Radio Convention in Newark, New Jersey, in October 2010.

Personal life
The older brother of longtime As the World Turns star Don Hastings, Hastings married Joan Rice in 1948. They were married for 66 years and, at the time of his death, the couple had four children, 10 grandchildren, and 13 great-grandchildren.

Bob Hastings died on June 30, 2014, from prostate cancer at age 89. His funeral mass was held in Burbank, California's Saint Finbar Catholic Church.

Filmography

References

External links

 
 
 
 Bob Hastings interview cinemaspy.com

1925 births
2014 deaths
20th-century American male actors
21st-century American male actors
Male actors from New York City
American game show hosts
American male film actors
American male soap opera actors
American male television actors
American male voice actors
American male radio actors
United States Army Air Forces personnel of World War II
American people of English descent
Burials at Forest Lawn Memorial Park (Hollywood Hills)
Deaths from cancer in California
Deaths from prostate cancer
People from Brooklyn
United States Army Air Forces officers
Military personnel from New York City
Catholics from New York (state)